The 1960 Cal Poly Pomona Broncos football team represented the Cal Poly Kellogg-Voorhis Unit—now known as California State Polytechnic University, Pomona—as an independent during the 1960 NCAA College Division football season. Led by fourth-year head coach Don Warhurst, Cal Poly Pomona compiled a record of 7–2. The team outscored its opponents 201 to 134 for the season.

Schedule

Notes

References

Cal Poly Pomona
Cal Poly Pomona Broncos football seasons
Cal Poly Pomona Broncos football